Isojoki (lit. "Big River") is a municipality of Finland. It is part of the South Ostrobothnia region. The municipality is unilingually Finnish and neighbour municipalities are Honkajoki, Karijoki, Kauhajoki, Kristinestad, Merikarvia and Siikainen.

Although the area isn't very high, one of the highest hills of southern Finland is located here (Lauhanvuori). Many Finns from this area immigrated to Minnesota, in the USA, as well as Michigan.

Industry: Wood, potato, machinery.

Tourism: Lauhanvuori National Park (hotel, viewtower, big smoke sauna, historical nature with many relics from ice-age)

Nature: Mostly Forest, swamp and agriculture

References

External links

Municipality of Isojoki – Official website

 
Populated places established in 1855
1855 establishments in the Russian Empire